Awoulaba is a Baoulé-language term from Ivory Coast meaning "queen of beauty", which refers to women displaying a   beauty ideal that consists of a plump and curvaceous body with large buttocks and wide hips. The ideal Awoulaba has a small waist-to-hip ratio (known as a "guitar shape") in which her buttocks are more opulent than the rest of her body. Ivorian photographer Joana Choumali describes Awoulabas as "beautiful women of impressive dimensions: a face with fine features, large breasts, a well-marked waist and, above all, big buttocks".  

Since 2011, locally manufactured mannequins depicting the Awoulaba body shape have become a familiar sight throughout numerous clothing shops in Abidjan, Ivory Coast and they are distinguished from foreign imported mannequins that depict slim women (described as Taille Fine, meaning "thin waist").

Beauty industry 
The beauty industry of Ivory Coast and other West African countries heavily profits from women desiring to enlarge their buttocks. Beauty products such as creams and pills that are advertised as enhancing the buttocks are common throughout large West African cities, and they carry health risks such as diabetes and high blood pressure. Also popular are butt augmentation surgeries, as well as padding giving the appearance of larger buttocks. This trend in the region has been blamed for some health concerns among women such as overweight, metabolic syndrome, and carcinogenic beauty products.

Miss Awoulaba
Miss Awoulaba is a beauty pageant that started in Abidjan, Ivory Coast during the early 1980s which was stated to reward "physical harmony and natural charm, with an inclination for women with prominent posteriors" and to showcase "authentic African beauty". Miss Awoulaba was organized as an alternative to Miss Cote d'Ivoire (Miss Ivory Coast), which was accused of favoring Western beauty features.  The women of Miss Awoulaba have curvier bodies compared to women of most Western beauty pageants and they are required to wear thick, black hair along with traditional hairstyles and clothing.

Prizes
First Lady Dominique Folloroux-Ouattara of Ivory Coast offered a cash prize of 5.5 million CFA francs to be shared among the top three winners of the 2015 competition and 1.5 million to the top three winners of the 2017 competition. The top winner of the 2019 competition was promised a Citroën C4 vehicle from Al Moustapha Toure, president of the Collective of Economic Operators of Côte d'Ivoire (COECI). Mayor Jean-Marc Yacé of Cocody offered 4 million CFA francs to be divided among the top three winners of the 2019 competition.

Winners
 2001 : Diaye Judith
 2002 : Kouamé Adjoua Félicia
 2007 : Dogo Gbaza Roselyne
 2013 : Marie Flore Ozoua Ourigbalé
 2014 : Doukouré Sagnon Millenne
 2015 : Laeticia Ines Kouakou Oussou
 2016 : Tatiana Ahoua Beugré
 2017 : Lehi Marcelle Okobe
 2018 : Stephanie Tapé Lou
 2019 : Yomb Josée Carène
 2021 : Tatiana Marie Alloua Yankey

See also
 Botcho
 Big Beautiful Woman
 Fat feminism
 Female body shape
 Feminine beauty ideal
 Miss Bumbum

References

Ivorian culture
Beauty pageants
Female beauty
Fat acceptance movement
Beauty pageants in Ivory Coast
Beauty pageants in Africa
Buttocks